The following is a list of notable deaths in January 1992.

Entries for each day are listed alphabetically by surname. A typical entry lists information in the following sequence:
 Name, age, country of citizenship at birth, subsequent country of citizenship (if applicable), reason for notability, cause of death (if known), and reference.

January 1992

1
Cele Abba, 85, Italian actress.
Konrad Bleuler, 79, Swiss quantum physicist.
Jack Badham, 72, English football player.
James W. B. Douglas, 78, British social researcher.
M. J. Frankovich, 82, American film producer, pneumonia.
Franz Fuchsberger, 81, Austrian football player.
Grace Hopper, 85, American naval admiral and computer scientist.
Oskar Munzel, 92, Germany Wehrmacht general during World War II.

2
Kenneth Emory, 94, American anthropologist.
Virginia Field, 74, British-born American actress, cancer.
Tibor Gallai, 79, Hungarian mathematician.
Hedwig Haß, 89, German Olympic fencer (1936).
Hans Kurath, 100, Austrian-American linguist.
Ginette Leclerc, 79, French actress, cancer.
Maurice Perrin, 80, French cyclist.
Yaúca, 56, Portuguese football player.

3
O. V. Alagesan, 80, Indian politician and freedom fighter.
Judith Anderson, 94, Australian actress, pneumonia.
Robert Gordis, 83, American conservative rabbi.
Carl McVoy, 61, American pianist.
Domenico Meldolesi, 51, Italian racing cyclist.
Matteo Poggi, 78, Italian football player and coach.
Antonio Quirino, 85, Filipino judge, entrepreneur and politician.
Radomiro Tomic, 77, Chilean politician.
Pavel Zyryanov, 84, Soviet major general and former commander of the Soviet Border Troops.

4
Alejandro Carrión, 76, Ecuadorian poet, novelist and journalist.
Patrick Gallacher, 82, Scottish football player.
Antonio Ghiardello, 93, Italian rower and Olympic medalist.
Teddy Grace, 86, American jazz singer.
Edmund Samarakkody, 79, Ceylonese lawyer, trade unionist, and politician.
Tim Washington, 32, American football player, pneumonia.

5
Ze'ev Aleksandrowicz, 86, Israeli photographer.
Philip J. Dolan, 68, American physicist.
Dattatraya Ganesh Godse, 77, Indian historian, playwright, and art critic.
Reuben "Rube" Lautenschlager, 76, American basketball player.
Chester Schaeffer, 89, American film editor.

6
Éva Balázs, 49, Hungarian cross-country skier and Olympian.
Carl Bridenbaugh, 88, American historian of Colonial America.
Bent Christensen, 62, Danish film director, actor, and screenwriter, cancer.
Nikolay Dutov, 53, Soviet-Russian long-distance runner.
Steve Gilpin, 42, New Zealand singer, traffic collision.

7
Richard Hunt, 40, American puppeteer (The Muppets).
Gilles Lalay, 29, French motorcycle racer, motorcycle accident.
Robert Lord, 46, New Zealand playwright.
Andrew Marton, 87, Hungarian-American film director, cancer.
Ian Wood, 90, Australian politician.

8
Proinsias Mac Airt, 69, Irish republican activist.
Abderrahim Bouabid, 69, Moroccan politician.
Anthony Dawson, 75, Scottish actor (Dr. No, Dial M for Murder, Valley of Eagles), cancer.
John Harrington, 70, American gridiron football player.
Marjorie Kane, 82, American film and stage actress.
Johnny Meijer, 79, Dutch accordionist.
Natan Peled, 78, Israeli politician.
Nicolas Schöffer, 79, Hungarian-French cybernetic artist.
Zoya Voskresenskaya, 84, Soviet diplomat, NKVD secret agent, and children's author.
Joe Zeno, 72, American gridiron football player.

9
Steve Brodie, 72, American actor, cancer.
Claude Coats, 78, American animator (Snow White and the Seven Dwarfs, Dumbo, Peter Pan).
Al Coppage, 75, American gridiron football player.
Hans Jenny, 92, Swiss-born soil scientist.
Walt Kichefski, 75, American football player and coach.
Bill Naughton, 81, British playwright.
Luigi Stipa, 91, Italian aeronautical engineer and aircraft designer.
Louis Terrenoire, 83, French politician.
Jochen van Aerssen, 50, German politician and member of the Bundestag.

10
Roberto Bonomi, 72, Argentine racing driver.
Barbara Couper, 89, British actress.
Johnny Hawke, 67, Australian rugby league football player, parkinson's disease.
James I. Loeb, 82, American politician and diplomat, pneumonia.
Daniel Norton, 86, Australian politician.

11
Heikki Aaltoila, 86, Finnish film composer.
Jean Claudio, 64, French actor.
Juan Gilberto Funes, 28, Argentine footballer, heart attack.
William George Hoskins, 83, English historian.
Edward Jancarz, 45, Polish speedway rider, knifed.
Morton Kaer, 89, American gridiron football player.
Eckart-Wilhelm von Bonin, 72, German Luftwaffe pilot during World War II.

12
Lode Anthonis, 69, Belgian racing cyclist.
Bilegiin Damdinsüren, 73, Mongolian musician and composer.
Kumar Gandharva, 67, Indian classical singer.
Walt Morey, 84, American author.
George Strohmeyer, 67, American gridiron football player.
Harry van Doorn, 76, Dutch politician.

13
Hugh Meade Alcorn, Jr., 84, American politician, stroke.
Yvonne Bryceland, 66, South African actress, cancer.
Dagny Lind, 89, Swedish film actress.
Josef Neckermann, 79, German equestrian and Olympic champion.
Mehdi Abbasov, 32, Azerbaijani politician and soldier, killed in battle.
Henri Queffélec, 81, French novelist.
Gerhard Rose, 95, German scientist and war criminal during World War II.

14
Irakli Abashidze, 82, Georgian poet, literary scholar and politician.
Walter Herssens, 61, Belgian decathlete and Olympian.
Ernst Wilhelm Kalinke, 73, German cinematographer.
Vernon E. Megee, 91, United States Marine Corps general.
Jerry Nolan, 45, American rock drummer, stroke.
Alf Teichs, 87, German filmmaker.
Flory Van Donck, 79, Belgian golfer.

15
Zhang Dazhi, 80, Chinese lieutenant general and politician.
Charlie Gassaway, 73, American baseball player.
Fritz Kraatz, 85, Swiss ice hockey player.
Dee Murray, 45, English bassist (Elton John Band), stroke.
Suzanne Muzard, 91, French prostitute and photographer.
Angel Penna, Sr., 68, Argentine-American racehorse trainer.
Hari Rhodes, 59, American actor, heart attack.

16
Ross Patterson Alger, 71, Canadian politician, cancer.
Walter Bartel, 87, German communist resistance member during World War II, and historian.
Albert R. Behnke, 88, American physician.
Ajahn Chah, 73, Thai Buddhist monk.
W. John Kenney, 87, United States Assistant Secretary of the Navy.
Carl-Gustaf Lindstedt, 70, Swedish comedian and actor, heart attack.
Shelagh Roberts, 67, British politician, cancer.

17
Dorothy Alison, 66, Australian actress.
Luigi Durand de la Penne, 77, Italian Navy admiral.
Henry Stommel, 71, American oceanographer.
Charlie Ventura, 75, American saxophonist, lung cancer.

18
Hamidul Huq Choudhury, 90, Bangladeshi politician.
Theodore L. Futch, 96, United States Army brigadier general.
George Hill, 90, American sprinter and Olympian.
Ruby R. Levitt, 84, American set decorator (The Sound of Music, The Andromeda Strain, Chinatown).
Cromie McCandless, 71, Northern Irish racing motorcyclist.
Shigeo Tanaka, 85, Japanese film director.
Douglas Woolf, 69, American author of novels and book reviews.

19
Augusto Benedico, 82, Spanish-Mexican actor.
Pietro di Donato, 80, American writer, bone cancer.
Albert Glock, 66, American archaeologist, murdered.
Bill Horton, 86, English rugby player.
Ted W. Lawson, 74, United States Air Force officer.
Manabendra Mukhopadhyay, 62, Indian singer-songwriter.

20
Mario Ariosa, 71, Cuban baseball player.
Milovan Gavazzi, 96, Croatian ethnographer.
Trond Hegna, 93, Norwegian politician.
Charles Kenny, 93, American composer, author, and violinist.
Theodore Lukits, 94, Romanian-American painter.
Jean-Pierre Lecocq, 44, Belgian molecular biologist, plane crash.
Tom McCarthy, 57, Canadian ice hockey player.

21
Edmund Collein, 86, German architect.
Bernard Cornut-Gentille, 82, French administrator and politician.
Champion Jack Dupree, 81, American blues musician, cancer.
Franz Hanreiter, 78, Austrian footballer.
Marita Katusheva, 53, Soviet volleyball player and Olympic silver medalist.
Eddie Mabo, 55, Australian indigenous people's activist, cancer.
Miguel Manzano, 84, Mexican actor, kidney failure.

22
A. J. Antoon, 47, American theatre director, AIDS-related lymphoma.
Mark Hopkinson, 42, American convicted murderer, execution by lethal injection.
Derek Walker-Smith, Baron Broxbourne, 81, British politician.
Fernand Buyle, 73, Belgian footballer.
Billy Graham, 69, American boxer, cancer.
Francisco Urroz, 71, Chilean football player.

23
Freddie Bartholomew, 67, English-American child actor, heart failure.
Harry Mortimer, 89, English composer and conductor.
Joseph Mugnaini, 79, Italian-American artist and illustrator.
Ian Wolfe, 95, American actor.

24
Ignacio Bernal, 81, Mexican anthropologist and archaeologist.
John Bleifer, 90, American actor.
Tina Chow, 41, American model and jewelry designer, AIDS.
Ken Darby, 82, American composer, lyricist, and conductor.
Klaes Karppinen, 84, Finnish cross-country skier and Olympic champion.
Ricky Ray Rector, 42, American convicted murderer, execution by lethal injection.
Talia Shapira, 45, Israeli actress, cancer.

25
Raban Adelmann, 79, German politician and member of the Bundestag.
Riad Ahmadov, 35, Azerbaijan  officer and war hero, killed in action.
Kay Beauchamp, 92, British communist activist and feminist.
Guido Buzzelli, 64, Italian comic book artist, writer, and painter.
Pedro Linares, 85, Mexican artist.
Mahmoud Riad, 75, Egyptian diplomat.

26
Sheldon Chumir, 51, Canadian lawyer and politician.
José Ferrer, 80, Puerto Rican actor (Cyrano de Bergerac, Lawrence of Arabia, The Caine Mutiny) and filmmaker, colorectal cancer.
Gilroy Roberts, 86, American sculptor and minter.
Hans Schulze, 80, German water polo player.

27
John Alcorn, 56, American artist, designer, and illustrator.
Boris Arapov, 86, Russian composer.
Bharat Bhushan, 71, Indian actor, scriptwriter and producer.
Gwen Ffrangcon-Davies, 101, English actress.
Sally Mugabe, 60, Zimbabwean activist, first lady (since 1987), kidney failure.
Henriette von Schirach, 78, German writer and wife to nazi politician Baldur von Schirach.
William Walker, 95, American television and film actor, cancer.

28
Arvid Andersson-Holtman, 95, Swedish gymnast and Olympic champion.
Nahman Avigad, 86, Israeli archaeologist.
Hans Lang, 83, Austrian composer of light music, film music and Viennese songs.
Ərəstun Mahmudov, 34, Azerbaijani officer and war hero, killed in action..
Marifat Nasibov, 19, Azerbaijani soldier and war hero, killed in action.
Viktor Seryogin, 47, Azerbaijani soldier and war hero, killed in action.
Mehmet Ali Yalım, 62, Turkish basketball player.
Arvo Ylppö, 104, Finnish physician and academic.

29
Michael Hicks Beach, 2nd Earl St Aldwyn, 79, British politician.
Noer Alie, 77, Indonesian Islamic leader and educator.
Willie Dixon, 76, American blues musician, heart failure.
Art Somers, 90, Canadian ice hockey player.

30
Francis Birch, 88, American geophysicist, prostate cancer.
Ed Taylor, 90, American baseball player.
George Frederick James Temple, 90, English mathematician9.
Coaker Triplett, 80, American baseball player.

31
Ludwig Geyer, 87, German cyclist.
Mel Hein, 82, American football player, stomach cancer.
Martin Held, 83, German television and film actor.
István Sárközi, 44, Hungarian Olympic footballer (1968), traffic collision.

References 

1992-01
 01